The 1960 United States Senate election in New Mexico took place on November 8, 1960. Incumbent Democratic Senator Clinton Anderson won re-election to a third term.

Primary elections
Primary elections were held on May 10, 1960.

Democratic primary

Candidates
Clinton Anderson, incumbent U.S. Senator
Mac J. Feldhake
James P. Speer, businessman
N. Tito Quintana, attorney

Results

Republican primary

Candidates
William F. Colwes, retired automobile dealer
Joseph Rendon, unsuccessful candidate for Republican nomination for U.S. Senate in 1954
Frederic W. Airy, advertising agent

Results

General election

Results

See also 
 1960 United States Senate elections

References

Bibliography
 

1960
New Mexico
United States Senate